The Branivojević was most powerful Serbian noble family of their time, that held possessions in Zahumlje, Travunija, and Primorije, later known as Hum. The progenitor, Branivoje, served Serbian King Stefan Milutin (ruled 1282–1321), and was given rule of Ston and Pelješac. The family had by 1325 emerged as the strongest family in Zahumlje, later Hum. In 1326, while serving Serbian King Stefan Dečanski (ruled 1321–31), Branoje Branivojević, as the lord of Ston and Pelješac at the time, was given a great two-handed sword. Probably at their highest point they ruled from Cetina river to the town of Kotor. 

Internal fights provided opportunity for the peripheral nobility, which would have bad consequences in the west, Hum; the Branivojević brothers entered politics in the relations with Venice, Croatian magnates and Bosnian ban. Though nominal vassals of Serbia, the Branivojević family attacked Serbian interests and other local nobles of Hum, who in 1326 turned against Serbia and the Branivojevići. The Hum nobility approached Stjepan Kotromanić II, the ban of Bosnia, who then annexed most of Hum. The Draživojević of Nevesinje, as vassals of the Bosnian Ban, became the leading family of Hum in 1330s.

Family tree

Branivoje ( 1318), a local magnate that served Serbian King Stefan Milutin
Branoje Branivojević (fl. 1326), Lord of Ston and Pelješac
Mihajlo Branivojević (died 1326)
Branko Branivojević (died 1326)
Brajko Branivojević (died 1326), married to Vojislava Vojinović

See also
War of Hum (1326–29)

References

Sources

Further reading

Banate of Bosnia
Bosnian noble families
14th-century Serbian nobility
Serbian noble families
14th century in Croatia
Medieval Herzegovina
Medieval Montenegro
Bay of Kotor
People of the Kingdom of Serbia (medieval)